Olaf Martin Kolsum (born 9 July 1873) was a Norwegian merchant and politician.

He was born in Skogn to Karl Peter Olsen Kolsum and Anne Cecilie Hansen, and settled in Tromsø. He was elected representative to the Storting for the period 1937–1945, for the Liberal Party. He served as mayor of Tromsø in 1915 and from 1922 to 1925.

References

1873 births
Year of death missing
People from Levanger
Politicians from Tromsø
Norwegian merchants
Liberal Party (Norway) politicians
Members of the Storting